The Devonian Foreknobs Formation is a mapped bedrock unit in Pennsylvania, Maryland, Virginia, and West Virginia.

Description
The Foreknobs Formation contains massive sandstones; siltstone; "redbeds" of brownish-gray sandstone, siltstone, and shale containing scattered marine fossils; and occasional quartz-pebble conglomerate or conglomeratic sandstone beds.

Stratigraphy
Dennison (1970) renamed the old Chemung Formation the Greenland Gap Group and divided it into the lower Scherr Formation and the upper Foreknobs Formation. De Witt (1974) extended the Scherr and Foreknobs into Pennsylvania, but did not use the term Greenland Gap Group.

Boswell, et al. (1987), does not recognize the Scherr and Foreknobs Formations in the subsurface of West Virginia and thus these formations are reduced from "group" to "formation" as the Greenland Gap Formation.

Rossbach and Dennison (1994) extended the Foreknobs into the Catawba syncline of southwestern Virginia.

The Foreknobs is divided into the following Members, in ascending order: Mallow Member, Briery Gap Sandstone Member, Blizzard Member, Pound Sandstone Member, and Red Lick Member

Fossils

Red beds within the Foreknobs contain scattered marine fossils, such as brachiopods.

Notable Exposures
Type section: along WV Highway 42, 0.48 km northwest of Scherr, Grant County, West Virginia

Age 
Relative age dating places the Foreknobs in the Late Devonian.

References 

Sandstone formations of the United States
Shale formations of the United States
Siltstone formations
Devonian Maryland
Devonian geology of Pennsylvania
Devonian geology of Virginia
Devonian West Virginia
Geologic formations of Maryland
Geologic formations of Pennsylvania
Geologic formations of Virginia
Geologic formations of West Virginia
Devonian southern paleotemperate deposits